is a Japanese actress, stunt woman, martial artist, fight choreographer, former female bodybuilder and powerlifter. She performed the high-risk stunts as a double for Lucy Liu in the film Charlie's Angels.

Early life
Michiko Nishiwaki was born on November 21, 1957, in Funabashi, Chiba. As a teenager growing up in Tokyo, she was interested in gymnastics and volleyball. She became interested in bodybuilding when she grew dissatisfied with her body image, regarding her legs as too heavy compared to her upper body.
Another turning point was her father's death, which motivated her to have her own say in the planning of her future.

Career

Sports
Unusual for Japanese society at the time, Nishiwaki became a powerlifter and eventually Japan's first female powerlifting champion and first female bodybuilding champion. She opened three fitness clubs co-owned by her brother.

Feature films
Her acting career began in the 1985 Hong Kong martial arts/comedy film My Lucky Stars, in which she played a Japanese fighter. Her performance caught the attention of Jackie Chan and Sammo Hung. She also appeared in films such as The Line of Duty III in 1988, City Cops, Princess Madam, and God of Gamblers in 1989. She was quickly typecast, playing villains and femme fatales in most of her Hong Kong films. At times she did not use a word of dialogue, since she could not speak Cantonese well at the time. After returning to Japan, she went to Thailand to star in Whore and the Policewoman in 1993. She appeared in the 1999 film Man on the Moon, starring Jim Carrey, and did stunts for Hollywood films such as Red Corner, Blade, Charlie's Angels, and Rush Hour 2. She made a cameo appearance in the 2022 movie Everything Everywhere All At Once.

Nishiwaki married in 1996 and subsequently moved to Moorpark, California, where she was living with her husband and son as of the middle of October 2013.

Filmography

Stunt and stunt double appearances

Notes and references

External links
 
 HK cinemagic entry

Living people
1957 births
Actresses from Tokyo
Japanese film actresses
Female powerlifters
Japanese female bodybuilders
People from Funabashi
Sportspeople from Tokyo
Action choreographers
Japanese emigrants to the United States